William "Will" Hoskin-Elliott (born 2 September 1993) is a professional Australian rules footballer playing for the Collingwood Football Club in the Australian Football League (AFL). He previously played for Greater Western Sydney from 2012 to 2016.

State football
Hoskin-Elliott played junior football for North Sunshine in the Western Region Football League (WRFL). During his time at the club he kicked 223 goals in 106 games, including 66 goals he kicked in the 2005 season, in which he won the Under-12 Division 3 best and fairest award. Three years later, in the 2008 season, he won the Under 16 Division 2 best and fairest award. Afterwards, Hoskin-Elliott joined the Western Jets in the TAC Cup. In the 2010 TAC Cup season, he played seven matches. He played only 12 matches in the 2011 TAC Cup season, but finished second in the club's best and fairest vote. Hoskin-Elliott represented Vic Metro in the 2011 AFL Under 18 Championships, including being selected among the best in their matches against Vic County and against Western Australia, and was selected for the All-Australian team.

AFL career

Greater Western Sydney
Hoskin-Elliott was drafted by Greater Western Sydney with the fourth overall selection in the 2011 national draft. He made his debut in Greater Western Sydney's inaugural season, in 2012, playing in the opening round of the season against Sydney, kicking one of the club's five goals. During the 2014 season, Hoskin-Elliott showed his promise, kicking 26 goals in 20 games. However, due to soft-tissue injuries, he only managed to play 11 games in the 2015 season and the first two games of the 2016 season. His last game at the club, a win against Geelong in the second round, saw him taking a screamer which was a Mark of the Year contender.

Collingwood
At the conclusion of the 2016 season, Hoskin-Elliott was traded to Collingwood for their second round pick of the 2017 AFL draft. Collingwood's List Manager, Derek Hine, said that he "is an elite talent, someone we thought highly of as a junior and a player we have tracked throughout his career."
Hoskin-Elliott kicked a career high six goals in the round 11 victory over Fremantle during the 2018 season. He made his 100th AFL appearance in the 2018 Grand Final against West Coast at the Melbourne Cricket Ground. Hoskin-Elliott missed the beginning of the 2019 season following minor surgery on his left iliotibial band. In February, he signed a contract extension, keeping him at Collingwood until the end of the 2022 season.

Personal life
Hoskin-Elliott's great-great grandfather Charlie Norris was a three-time premiership player, once for Collingwood in 1910 and twice for Fitzroy in 1913 and 1916. Hoskin-Elliott grew up supporting Collingwood, in West Sunshine a suburb in the west of Melbourne. He married his high school sweetheart, Kirstie, in October 2017, and she gave birth to their first child, Flynn, in May 2018. Followed by a daughter Ivy in April 2021

Statistics
Updated to the end of the 2022 season.

|-
| 2012 ||  || 33
| 10 || 9 || 2 || 80 || 36 || 116 || 36 || 12 || 0.9 || 0.2 || 8.0 || 3.6 || 11.6 || 3.6 || 1.2 || 2
|-
| 2013 ||  || 33
| 9 || 3 || 9 || 71 || 34 || 105 || 33 || 15 || 0.3 || 1.0 || 7.9 || 3.8 || 11.7 || 3.7 || 1.7 || 0
|-
| 2014 ||  || 33
| 20 || 26 || 20 || 187 || 75 || 262 || 96 || 50 || 1.3 || 1.0 || 9.4 || 3.8 || 13.1 || 4.8 || 2.5 || 2
|-
| 2015 ||  || 33
| 11 || 3 || 8 || 75 || 32 || 107 || 45 || 28 || 0.3 || 0.7 || 6.8 || 2.9 || 9.7 || 4.1 || 2.5 || 0
|-
| 2016 || || 33
| 2 || 1 || 0 || 14 || 6 || 20 || 7 || 6 || 0.5 || 0.0 || 7.0 || 3.0 || 10.0 || 3.5 || 3.0 || 0
|-
| 2017 ||  || 32
| 22 || 18 || 6 || 246 || 159 || 405 || 143 || 70 || 0.8 || 0.3 || 11.2 || 7.2 || 18.4 || 6.5 || 3.2 || 4
|-
| 2018 ||  || 32
| 26 || 42 || 16 || 226 || 117 || 343 || 135 || 45 || 1.6 || 0.6 || 8.7 || 4.5 || 13.2 || 5.2 || 1.7 || 3
|-
| 2019 ||  || 32
| 19 || 19 || 8 || 196 || 87 || 283 || 128 || 33 || 1.0 || 0.4 || 10.3 || 4.6 || 14.9 || 6.7 || 1.7 || 0
|-
| 2020 ||  || 32
| 18 || 11 || 8 || 123 || 72 || 195 || 85 || 17 || 0.6 || 0.4 || 6.8 || 4.0 || 10.8 || 4.7 || 0.9 || 0
|-
| 2021 ||  || 32
| 20 || 13 || 2 || 213 || 101 || 314 || 124 || 45 || 0.7 || 0.1 || 10.7 || 5.1 || 15.7 || 6.2 || 2.3 || 0
|-
| 2022 ||  || 32
| 24 || 14 || 7 || 203 || 115 || 318 || 98 || 51 || 0.6 || 0.3 || 8.5 || 4.8 || 13.3 || 4.1 || 2.1 || 0
|- class=sortbottom
! colspan=3 | Career
! 181
! 159
! 86
! 1634
! 834
! 2468
! 930
! 372
! 0.9
! 0.5
! 9.0
! 4.6
! 13.6
! 5.1
! 2.1
! 11
|}

Notes

Honours and achievements
Team
 NEAFL premiership player (WSU Giants): 2016

References

External links

1993 births
Living people
Greater Western Sydney Giants players
Australian rules footballers from Melbourne
Western Jets players
Collingwood Football Club players
People from Sunshine, Victoria